The Bratslav Viceroyalty (Russian:  Брацлавское наместничество) was  within the Russian Empire that existed between 1793 and 1796.

History 
The territory of the Bratslav Viceroyalty was previously part of the Bracław and Podolian Voivodeships of the Polish-Lithuanian Commonwealth. The Bracław Voivodeship was created in 1566 as part of the Grand Duchy of Lithuania, and was passed to the Crown of Poland in 1569. On , shortly after his ascension to the throne, Emperor Paul I ordered the liquidation of the viceroyalty as part of wider administrative reforms.

References 

Viceroyalties of the Russian Empire
States and territories established in 1793
1793 establishments in the Russian Empire
1796 disestablishments in the Russian Empire